The 2016–17 Fort Wayne Mastodons men's basketball team, formerly known as the IPFW Mastodons, represented Indiana University – Purdue University Fort Wayne during the 2016–17 NCAA Division I men's basketball season. The Mastodons, led by third-year head coach Jon Coffman, played their home games at the Gates Sports Center and the Allen County War Memorial Coliseum as members of The Summit League. They finished the season 20–13, 8–8 in Summit League play to finish in a three-way tie for fourth place. They defeated the number 3 ranked Indians Hoosiers 71-68 in overtime. They lost in the quarterfinals of the Summit League tournament to Omaha. They were invited to the CollegeInsider.com Tournament where they defeated Ball State in the first round and received a second round bye before losing in the quarterfinals to Texas A&M–Corpus Christi.

This was the first season in which the IPFW athletic program has been officially branded as "Fort Wayne", following a change in athletic department policy announced on August 8, 2016. The Summit League had started using "Fort Wayne" in 2012 as part of a conference initiative, and some IPFW teams had been using the "Fort Wayne" branding before the August 2016 announcement.

Previous season 
The Mastodons finished the 2015–16 season 24–10, 12–4 in Summit League play to finish in a tie for the regular season championship. They lost in the semifinals of the Summit League tournament to North Dakota State. As a regular season league champion who was also the No. 1 seed in their league tournament, they received an automatic bid to the National Invitation Tournament where they lost in the first round to San Diego State.

Roster

Schedule and results

|-
!colspan=9 style=|  Exhibition

|-
!colspan=9 style=|  Regular season

|-
!colspan=9 style=| The Summit League tournament

|-
!colspan=9 style=| CIT

References

Purdue Fort Wayne Mastodons men's basketball seasons
Fort Wayne
Fort Wayne
2016 in sports in Indiana
2017 in sports in Indiana